Badgerys Creek, an electoral district of the Legislative Assembly in the Australian state of New South Wales, was created in 1991 and abolished in 1999.


Members

Election results

1995

1991

References

New South Wales state electoral results by district